Mergers & Acquisitions is a real-time B2B community, featuring a monthly magazine, daily enewsletter, conferences and member gatherings that provide news, commentary, data, analysis and community around the burgeoning middle market, providing analysis regarding private equity and cross-border mergers and acquisitions.

Mergers & Acquisitions was founded as Mergers & Acquisitions Journal in 1965. It was operated by several different companies prior to its current owner, Middle Market Information LLC. The brand's editor in chief since 2011 has been Mary Kathleen Flynn.

In addition to news and analysis about middle market M&A, Mergers & Acquisitions publishes numerous annual, monthly and weekly features and special reports that spotlight important deals and the people and firms who made them happen. These include the Most Influential Women in Mid-Market M&A, the Annual Mid-Market Awards and Dealmakers of the Year, Rising Stars of Private Equity, and M&A Most Innovative Firms.

References

External links

Monthly magazines published in the United States
Business magazines published in the United States
Magazines established in 1965
Magazines published in New York City